Bodychoke was an experimental noise rock side project of power electronics band Sutcliffe Jügend active between 1993 and 1999. The band released four studio albums, most notably their debut Mindshaft (Freek Records) produced by British psychedelic dub musician Ott and Five Prostitutes which was produced by Steve Albini. Their music expressed themes of hate and disgust, as well as some of the sexual perversion and death tackled by Sutcliffe Jügend.

The band's style is hard to categorize, a combination of noise rock, post-rock, industrial music and even gothic rock elements. A typical Bodychoke song is driven along by a strong repetitive riff on the bass and drums, tensioned against layers of distorted guitar noise, with vocals ranging from bassy murmurs to deranged screaming. From 1996, cello featured as both a melodic and rhythmic element, and sometimes as a source of ambient sound-effects. The arrival of Manu Ros in 1998 brought a more complex, "tribal" feel to the drumming.

Members 
 Kevin Tomkins – vocals, guitar
 Paul Taylor – vocals, guitar
 Gary Kean – bass guitar
 Mike Alexander – cello
 Manu Ros – drums (1998–1999)
 Jamie Hitchens – drums (1993–1998)

Discography

Studio albums 
Mindshaft (1994), Freek Records
Five Prostitutes (1996), Freek Records
Cold River Songs (1998), Purity
Completion (2004), 2nd Floor Mafia Productions
Cold River Songs (remastered featuring bonus material) (2009), Relapse Records

References 

British noise rock groups
Relapse Records artists
Musical groups established in 1993
Musical groups disestablished in 1999